The City of Muskegon was a steel-hulled sidewheel package and passenger steamer, built in 1881 for service on the Great Lakes, which was wrecked early on Tuesday 28 October 1919 when it struck a pier at Muskegon, Michigan, at 0430 hrs., in a 60 mph gale, sinking in a period estimated between four and ten minutes. Nine crew and six passengers were killed. There are conflicting sources on the number on board, however. One account listed 37 passengers and a crew of 35.

Background
There are conflicting accounts of the vessel's history.

The City of Muskegon was built in Detroit in 1881 by the Holland Steamship Company, and was originally named the City of Holland according to one period press account, which was incorrect.

Actually built as the City of Milwaukee by the Detroit Dry Dock Company at Wyandotte, Michigan, as Hull 44 and launched 12 February 1881, it was initially operated by Goodrich Transportation Company, Chicago, Illinois, with vessel official number 125906. It was then sold to the Detroit, Grand Haven and Milwaukee Railway (later part of the Great Western Railway), on 1 May 1883, operating between Milwaukee, Wisconsin, and Grand Haven, Michigan. Sold in 1897, it plied between Holland, Michigan and Chicago for the Graham & Morton Line (Graham and Morton Transportation Company), and was renamed Holland, also reported as City of Holland.

She was 231 feet in length or 241 feet in length, with a gross tonnage of 1148 tons.

She was sold in 1917 to the Crosby Line, of Milwaukee, and reportedly rebuilt. Crosby Transportation Company took over for the railroad's cross-lake transportation.

The vessel was transferred to the Holland Steamship Company, Milwaukee, Crosby Transportation Company, manager, in 1918. Renamed Muskegon in 1919.

Accident
The City of Muskegon, being operated by the Crosby Line, under the command of Capt. Edward Miller, according to two sources, or Edwin Miller, according to another, departed Milwaukee, Wisconsin, on Monday evening, 27 October 1919, with 72 passengers and crew aboard. The weather was clear. It was caught in a “raging” northwester on Lake Michigan early in the morning. Rather than come about, Capt. Miller made for the port at Muskegon, but he said that the vessel struck the bar at the entrance to the harbor. “A wheel paddle jammed in the sand, checking headway, and the great combers threw the ship about and hurled her into the pier.” She struck the south pier of the Muskegon channel. “There she hung, momentarily, pounding into wreckage, and then slipping off into the deep channel, going down in 50 feet of water and blocking the harbor entrances.

“Fifty of the 72 passengers and crew guided to safety by a single flashlight in the hands of a coast guard, are known to have been saved. It was feared several were caught between decks. Survivors, most of whom escaped only in their night clothing, were being cared for by the Red Cross.”

Another source lists the number of passengers as only 37.

The survivors told of the bravery of Capt. Miller, his officers and crew, “who remained at their posts to the last.” “Capt. Miller, sensing disaster as the vessel was driven toward the pier, ordered all to leap for their lives, and the time-hallowed sea rule, ‘Women first,’ was followed. Only four women, one of whom was employed on the boat, were known tonight to have been lost.”

“Capt. Miller declared the undertow swung his ship after she struck the bar. ‘I told the cabin boys to waken the passengers and crew and ordered all over the rail.’ He said, ‘Those who moved quickly were saved. The ones who held back lost their lives.’”

The vessel was smashed to pieces. Within four minutes of striking, no portion of it remained above the waterline.

Coast Guardsman R. J. Kaknborsky was credited with saving many lives, directing the way to safety with a flashlight just before the vessel was pounded to pieces.

References

1881 ships
Passenger ships of the United States
Ships sunk with no fatalities
Shipwrecks of Lake Michigan
Maritime incidents in 1919
Steamships of the United States
Ships built in Detroit